Adelphicos nigrilatum, the burrowing snake, is a species of colubrid snake found in Mexico.

References

Adelphicos
Endemic reptiles of Mexico
Reptiles described in 1942
Taxa named by Hobart Muir Smith